Stefan Edberg and Slobodan Živojinović were the defending champions, but Živojinović decided to rest after competing in the Davis Cup the previous week.

Edberg teamed up with Anders Järryd and successfully defended his title, by defeating Chip Hooper and Mike Leach 3–6, 6–3, 6–4 in the final.

Seeds

Draw

Draw

References

External links
 Official results archive (ATP)
 Official results archive (ITF)

ABN World Tennis Tournament
1987 ABN World Tennis Tournament
March 1987 sports events in Europe